Radial shaft seals, also known as lip seals, are used to seal rotary elements, such as a shaft or rotating bore.  Common examples include strut seals, hydraulic pump seals, axle seals, power steering seals, and valve stem seals.  Early radial shaft seals utilized rawhide as the sealing element, and many present-day elastomeric seal companies were once tanneries.  The advent of modern elastomers replaced rawhide, industry also added a garter spring, which helps the sealing lip compensate for lip wear and elastomer material changes.

The seal construction consists of a sprung main sealing lip which has a line contact with the shaft. The line contact is formed by two angles, with the air side angle usually less than the oil side angle.  Depending on the seal type these two angles are varied to create a pressure distribution at the seal contact line which has a steeper slope on the oil side of the seal.  The shallower the slope on the oil side of the seal, the wetter the seal will run. The spring is positioned such that axially the centerline of the spring is biased to the air side of the lip contact line.  These seals can be designed with a wide range of lip configurations to optimize lubrication retention and contaminant exclusion.

In order to exclude contaminants numerous types of dust lips or exclusionary lips may be used.  Common elastomers include FKM, ACM, NBR, HNBR, and AEM.  In order to resist wear, the compounds' durometer (hardness) is typically 70 to 85 Shore A (between that of an automobile tire and a soft inline-skate wheel).

A different seal design for similar applications is a rotating face seal.

Simmerring 

A commonly used expression is "Simmerring". This product name and Simmer-Ring are trademarks of Freudenberg Sealing Technologies.

Simmerring is derived from the name of the developer, the Austrian engineer Walther Simmer, who worked for Freudenberg. The first development 1929 in Kufstein Tirol  Austria,  consisted of leather and metal.

Standards 
Standards and other documents relating to radial shaft seals

ISO 6194-1:1982 	Rotary shaft lip type seals – Nominal dimensions and tolerances
ISO 6194-2:1991 	Rotary shaft lip type seals – Vocabulary
ISO 6194-3:1988 	Rotary shaft lip type seals – Storage, handling and installation
ISO 6194-4:1988 	Rotary shaft lip type seals – Performance test procedures
ISO 6194-5:1990 	Rotary shaft lip type seals – Identification of visual imperfections
SAE J946-1989 	Application Guide to Radial Lip Seals
RMA OS-4, 1984 	Application Guide for Radial Lip Type Shaft Seals
RMA OS-7, 1982 	Storage and Handling Guide for Radial Lip Type Shaft Seals
RMA OS-8, 1977 	Visual Variations Guide for Rotating Shaft Seals
DIN 3760 	Radial-Wellendichtringe (Radial shaft seals)
DIN 3761 	Radial-Wellendichtringe für Kraftfahrzeuge (Motor Vehicles Radial shaft seals), Parts 1-15. This standard covers all aspects including vocabulary, material requirements and test methods.
GOST 8752-79. CIS standard for rotary shaft seals.

See also 
 Stuffing box
 Gland seal

References

External links 

 Description & schematic of a shaft seal

Seal rings